10 Jahre – Best Of is the first compilation album by L'Âme Immortelle.

Track listing 
 "5 Jahre"
 "Phönix"
 "Nur Du"
 "Tiefster Winter"
 "Aus den Ruinen"
 "Fallen Angel"
 "Stumme Schreie"
 "Judgement"
 "Lass mich fallen"
 "Du siehst mich nicht"
 "Gefallen"
 "Stern"
 "Bitterkeit"
 "Figure in the Mirror"
 "Life Will Never Be the Same Again"
 "Come Closer"
 "No Tomorrow"

References

2007 greatest hits albums
German-language compilation albums
L'Âme Immortelle compilation albums